Zonaria picta is a species of sea snail, a cowry, a marine gastropod mollusk in the family Cypraeidae, the cowries.

Description

Distribution
 Distribution West Africa: Cape Verde Islands, Senegal to Gambia

References

External links

Cypraeidae
Gastropods described in 1824
Taxa named by John Edward Gray